FRS may also refer to:

Government and politics
 Facility Registry System, a centrally managed Environmental Protection Agency database that identifies places of environmental interest in the United States
 Family Resources Survey, a survey to collect information on the incomes and circumstances of households in Great Britain
 Federal Reserve System, the central bank of the United States
 Fire and Rescue Service, an organization that provides predominantly emergency firefighting services for a specific geographic area
 Fisheries Research Services, a now-defunct agency of the Executive agencies of the Scottish Government
 Forum of Social Republicans, now the Christian Democratic Party, a French political party

Science
 Fellow of the Royal Society, an award and fellowship granted by the Royal Society of London to individuals the society judges to have made a "substantial contribution to the improvement of natural knowledge"
 Filtered Rayleigh scattering, a diagnostic technique which measures velocity, temperature, and pressure
 Forward recoil scattering, an ion beam analysis technique in materials science to obtain elemental concentration depth profiles in thin films
 Fragment separator, an ion-optical device used to focus and separate products from the collision of relativistic ion beams with thin targets
 Framingham Risk Score, a gender-specific algorithm used to estimate the 10-year cardiovascular risk of an individual.
 Free radical scavenger, a synonym for antioxidant
 Free radical substitution, a substitution reaction involving free radicals as a reactive intermediate

Technology
 Family Radio Service, an improved walkie-talkie radio system in the United States
 File Replication Service, a Microsoft Windows Server service for distributing shared files and Group Policy objects
 Frame Relay Switch, a standardized wide-area network technology that specifies the physical and data link layers of digital telecommunications channels using a packet switching methodology
 Freely redistributable software, software that anyone is free to redistribute
 Functional requirement Specification, defines a function of a system or its components
 Facial recognition system, a computer application capable of identifying or verifying a person from a digital image or a video frame from a video source

Transportation
 Ffestiniog Railway Society, a 1 ft 11 1⁄2 in (597 mm) narrow gauge heritage railway, located in Gwynedd, Wales
 Flandre Air, (ICAO: FRS) was a French regional airline
 Förde Reederei Seetouristik, a German shipping company
 Forsinard railway station, in northern Scotland
 Franconia–Springfield station, Amtrak station code FRS
 Full-rigged ship, a sailing vessel's sail plan with three or more masts, all of them square-rigged
 Mundo Maya International Airport, (IATA: FRS, formerly Flores International Airport) in Flores, Guatemala
 Scion FR-S, an automobile

Other uses 
 Fixed repeating schedule, a production scheduling methodology
 Fleet Replacement Squadron, a unit of the United States Navy and Marine Corps
 Free Record Shop, a Dutch retailer
 Frontier Regional School, in South Deerfield, Massachusetts, United States
 Saterland Frisian language, last living dialect of the East Frisian language
 East Frisian Low Saxon, Frisian-Saxon dialect of East Frisia